Deh Shahik (also Romanized as Deh Shahīk; also known as Deh Shahak) is a village in Chahdegal Rural District, Negin Kavir District, Fahraj County, Kerman Province, Iran. At the 2006 census, its population was 49, in 11 families.

References 

Populated places in Fahraj County